The 2015 Carolina RailHawks season will be the club's ninth season of existence, and their fifth consecutive season in North American Soccer League, the second division of the American soccer pyramid.

The season will follow the Spring / Fall format adopted by the NASL in 2013 with the Spring season starting on April 4 and lasting for 10 games until June 13, while the Fall season will begin on 4 July, and will end on October 30. There will be a 4 team postseason format, including the champions of the Spring and Fall seasons, with the 2 other teams with the best records joining them.

Club

Roster

Out on loan

Transfers

Winter
Note: Flags indicate national team as has been defined under FIFA eligibility rules. Players may hold more than one non-FIFA nationality.

In:

Out:

Summer
Note: Flags indicate national team as has been defined under FIFA eligibility rules. Players may hold more than one non-FIFA nationality.

In:

Out:

Competitions

Pre-season and Exhibitions

Pre-season

Exhibitions

NASL Spring Season 

The Spring season will last for 10 games beginning on April 4 and ending on June 6.  The schedule will feature a single round robin format with each team playing every other team in the league a single time.

Standings

Results

Results by round

Match reports

NASL Fall Season 

The Fall season will last for 10 games beginning on July 4 and ending on October 30.  The schedule will feature a double round robin format with each team playing every other team in the league twice, one at home and one on the road. The winner of the Fall season will qualify for the Soccer Bowl playoffs.

Standings

Results

Results by round

Match reports

U.S. Open Cup 

The RailHawks will compete in the 2015 edition of the Open Cup.

Squad statistics

Appearances and goals

|-
|colspan="14"|Players who appeared for Carolina RailHawks who left the club during the season:

|-
|}

Goal scorers

Disciplinary record

References 

North Carolina FC seasons
Carolina Railhawks Football Club
Carolina Railhawks Football Club
2015 in sports in North Carolina